Rich tea is a type of sweet biscuit; the ingredients generally include wheat flour, sugar, vegetable oil and malt extract. Originally called Tea Biscuits, they were developed in the 19th century in Yorkshire, England for the upper classes as a light snack between full-course meals. One of the best-selling biscuits in the British Isles, the biscuit is also popular in Malta and Cyprus. The plain flavour and consistency of rich tea makes them particularly suitable for dunking in tea and coffee. It is also common to apply spreads such as butter and/or preserves to the back of rich tea biscuits. 

McVitie's have used the brand name "Rich Tea" since 1891 and remains the most well-known manufacturer in the UK. Since 2000, most major supermarkets sell an own-brand version of the biscuits.

They are also sold as a finger variety and, as Rich Tea Creams, a long thin rectangular version with vanilla cream sandwiched between two biscuits (made by Fox's). The Morning Coffee biscuit is rectangular rather than round but is similar to the rich tea.

See also
Biscuit tin
Digestive biscuit, biscuits with fibre and a dark colour from the sweet outer layers of wheat 
Malted milk (biscuit), biscuits that contain both malt and milk
Marie biscuit, round biscuits with vanilla flavouring
Picnic biscuit
Marie finger biscuit

References

External links
 Review of biscuit on Nice Cup of Tea and a Sit Down

Biscuits
Yorkshire cuisine